The Libby River is a  river in the town of Scarborough, Maine, in the United States. It is tidal in its lower reaches, and it is a tributary of the Scarborough River, joining it just above that river's mouth at the Atlantic Ocean.

See also
List of rivers of Maine

References

Maine Streamflow Data from the USGS
Maine Watershed Data From Environmental Protection Agency

Rivers of Cumberland County, Maine
Scarborough, Maine
Rivers of Maine